could refer to one of four Buddhist temples in Japan:

Sōfuku-ji (Fukuoka)
Sōfuku-ji (Gifu)
Sōfuku-ji (Nagasaki)
Sōfuku-ji (Ōtsu)